Auspicious train tickets refer to train tickets with auspicious messages on them derived from the beginning and end stations on the ticket. Messages often employ homophonic puns in both Mandarin and Hokkien and shuffling the order of characters to reach the desired effect. In Taiwan, the Edmondson tickets are sought by collectors and people wishing for good luck.

History 
In 1973, an NHK television show in Obihiro, Hokkaido, Japan reported that tickets from Kōfuku Station and Aikoku Station carried an auspicious meaning. The kanji of the two characters could be interpreted as "happiness" and "country of love", respectively. The two stations then saw a surge of tourists seeking the tickets.

In 1993, after preservation work was completed at Bao'an railway station, the Taiwan Railways Administration (TRA) sought to promote the historic station for tourism. Railway researcher Ming-xun Hsieh proposed that the TRA sell special edition tickets from Yongkang railway station. Hsieh was inspired by the Kōfuku–Aikoku ticket's success in attracting visitors and believed the same strategy would work in Taiwan as well. The ticket's characters, when read in a clockwise fashion, read "Yongbao Ankang", which meant "peace and health forever." The ticket became an unexpected hit and started the practice of collecting auspicious train tickets.

The Yongbao Ankang tickets saw a surge of popularity on 9 September 2010. Tickets in Taiwan are printed with the date and time when entering the station. The limited edition tickets, which were printed on thicker paper, sold out very quickly.

Types

References 

Luck
Railway culture